St. Andrews Bungalow Court is a grouping of bungalows built in 1919–20 in the Colonial Revival style in Hollywood, California.  Based on the structures' well-preserved multi-family courtyard architecture, the grouping was added to the National Register of Historic Places in 1998. The listing included 15 contributing buildings.

St. Andrews Bungalow Court was featured in the 2007 20th Century Fox movie Alvin and the Chipmunks as well as its 2009 sequel.  It served as the home of Dave Seville (played by Jason Lee), one of the main characters of the movie.

It was built as an investment for Fay Sudrow, a widow. It was "an example of an 'owner/builder' construction, a common practice in early Hollywood", in which standard, inexpensive, wood-frame construction was done, without use of an architect or non-essential decorative refinements.  Architectural plans for part of the complex might have been purchased from a design service.

See also
 List of Registered Historic Places in  Los Angeles

References
2. IMDb, “Alvin and the Chipmunks”  https://www.imdb.com/title/tt0952640/?ref_=adv_li_tt

Bungalow courts
Buildings and structures in Hollywood, Los Angeles
Houses completed in 1920
Houses on the National Register of Historic Places in Los Angeles
Historic districts on the National Register of Historic Places in California
Residential buildings in Los Angeles
Colonial Revival architecture in California